The beach handball competition at the 2013 World Games was held from 2nd August to 4th August, at the Cañaveralejo Bull Fighting Ring in Cali, Colombia.

Medal summary

Men's tournament

Preliminary round

Group A

Group B

Knockout stage

Women's tournament

Preliminary round

Group A

Group B

Knockout stage

References

2013 World Games
2013 World Games
2013
2013 in handball